The Littlestown Brown Stockings were a minor league baseball team based in Littlestown, Pennsylvania. In 1884 and 1885, Littlestown played as exclusively as members of the Independent level Keystone Association.

History
The Keystone Association and the member teams were formed at a March 3, 1884 meeting in Lancaster, Pennsylvania. Carlisle, Pennsylvania and West Chester, Pennsylvania were franchises admitted to the league but never played.

The Littlestown Brown Stockings began play in 1884, as the Keystone Association played as a five–team Independent league. The other Keystone Association franchises were based in Chambersburg, Pennsylvania, Chester, Pennsylvania, Lancaster, Pennsylvania and York, Pennsylvania.

The Littlestown Brown Stockings officially began Keystone Association play on May 2, 1884. During the 1884 season, the Chester franchise disbanded on June 2, 1884 and Lancaster disbanded on June 7, 1884, causing the rest of the league to fold. On June 10, 1884 the league folded for the season with the Brown Stockings in 5th place, 6.5 games behind 1st place Lancaster. The League standings when the league folded were Lancaster Red Stockings (15–4), York White Roses (10–10), Chambersburg (8–10), Chester Blue Stockings (8–10) and Littlestown Brown Stockings (6–8).

In their final season, the 1885 Littlestown Brown Stockings returned to Keystone Association play as the league featured the same five returning franchises. Chambersburg, the Chester Blue Stockings, Lancaster Red Stockings and York White Roses were the other returning 1885 league members.

The 1885 Keystone Association final team standings are unknown.

The Littlestown Brown Stockings and the Keystone Association both permanently folded after the 1885 season. Littlestown has not hosted another minor league team.

The ballpark
The exact name of the Littlestown Brown Stockings' home ballpark in 1884 and 1885 is not directly referenced.

Timeline

Year–by–year records

The Littlestown Brown Stockings' 1885 record is unknown.

Notable alumni

Frank Berkelbach (1884)
Bart Cantz (1884)
Ed Greer (1884)
John Hofford (1884)

See also
Littlestown (minor league baseball) players

References

External links
Baseball Reference

Defunct baseball teams in Pennsylvania
Baseball teams established in 1884
Baseball teams disestablished in 1885
Keystone Association teams
Adams County, Pennsylvania
1885 disestablishments in Pennsylvania